Aisles is a six-piece progressive rock band originally from Santiago, Chile. The group was formed in 2001 by brothers Germán (guitar) and Luis Vergara (keyboards), and childhood friend Rodrigo Sepúlveda (guitar). Later on, it expanded to include lead singer Sebastián Vergara and Alejandro Meléndez (keyboards). Drummer Felipe Candia and bassist Daniel Baird-Kerr joined the band in 2007 and 2011 respectively.

The band has often been praised by its eclectic style, combining elements of rock, progressive rock, fusion, and Latin music, among others. It has toured South America, North America and Europe, and has participated in numerous prog-rock festivals. Its albums have been published in Europe, the United States, and Japan, and in 2009 was nominated for Best Foreign Record in the Prog Awards for their second album, In Sudden Walks.

The band's third album 4:45 AM was released in 2013, and their fourth album, Hawaii, was released in 2016.

History

Formation, The Yearning (2001–2005)
Aisles was formed in 2001 by Germán Vergara (guitar, vocals), his brother Luis (keyboards), and childhood friend Rodrigo Sepúlveda (guitar, vocals). Alejandro Meléndez, originally from Brazil, joined the band in 2002. When looking for lead singers, the band asked Germán and Luis' younger brother, Sebastián, to record a demo with the intent of auditioning prospective lead singers but, surprised by his vocal skills, asked him to be their permanent vocalist.  The band's first line up was then complete.

After playing gigs at local clubs and bars, the band entered the studio in 2003 with the aim of recording its first demo for promotional purposes, but having achieved such a high quality of sound and interpretation decided to release that effort as their first full-length album. The Yearning (2005) was mixed and mastered over a span of ten weeks, and was subsequently released and distributed in South America, Europe, the United States, and Japan receiving generally positive reviews by specialized press. Françoise Couture of Allmusic wrote "The Yearning, Chilean band Aisles' first calling card, is a convincing disc of South American-flavored neo-progressive rock. Nothing gets reinvented. But the lads clearly know what they are doing", while Conor Fines of Prog Sphere stated "based on its own merits, Aisles' The Yearning is a very good debut. Melody, strong songwriting, admirable performances, and enough details in the music to be worth going back to quite a few times makes the album an unlikely winner."

Touring, In Sudden Walks (2006–2011)
After the release of its debut album, the band spent most of 2006 touring in the local circuit, playing in venues such as House of Rock, Subterráneo, and a number of theatres across the country. In 2006, Felipe González joined the band to play bass during live performances and in late 2007 Felipe Candia joined the band on drums to start rehearsals for Aisles' second album.

The works for the band's second album extended for over a year. This time the group took a darker, more visual approach, mixing elements of music and drama, as shown in the opening track, "Mariachi". The broadening sound, the inclusion of genres such as Latin music, and the high sound quality and production made many consider the album a leap forward. In Sudden Walks was self-produced and released in January 2009. Once again, the album was well received by fans and critics. Cesar Inca of Prog Archives said "In Sudden Walks may have been one of the 5 most accomplished neo-prog albums of 2009. It is a lovely collection of inventive compositions and bold arrangements", while David Dashifen Kees of USA Progressive Music stated "From moment one, the album reveals a unique composition of sounds which display an understanding of music and a depth of theme and creativity that many other bands lack."

In August 2009, Aisles was the only South American band invited to participate in the Crescendo Prog Rock festival in Saint-Palais Sur Mer, France, and was later nominated for the Prog Awards in Best Foreign Record category in Italy. After touring Europe, the band spent the rest of 2010 playing in its home country, in venues such as Sala SCD, Sala Master, Teatro Nemesio Antúnez, and Café del Teatro, among others. In late 2010, keyboardist Luis Vergara left the band due to musical differences.

4:45 AM (2011–2014)
In the second half of 2011, Daniel Baird-Kerr joined the band as a full-time bassist to start rehearsals for the band's upcoming album. With a new line up, and a strong desire to internationalize their career, Aisles started working on their third album.

4:45 AM was recorded in several studios in Santiago between July 2012 and August 2013, with production duties taken by guitarist Germán Vergara. The album had a greater emphasis on visual aesthetics, taking elements from drama and other art forms. 4:45 AM was released in October 2013 through Presagio Records. The album was critically acclaimed; Brian McKinnon of Prog Rock Music Talk said: ""4:45 AM is nothing short of a masterwork of art. It is the reason people fall in love with music in the first place. An astounding piece of work for the ages". Breakout, one of Germany's most long-established rock magazines, chose "4:45 AM" as one of the best albums of the month. The album was released at a show on 22 October 2014, at Teatro Ladrón de Bicycletas, in Santiago de Chile. A couple of months before this shows, keyboardist Alejandro Meléndez left, and was replaced by his friend Juan Pablo Gaete.

Hawaii (2015–present)
In July 2015, the band started writing songs for their upcoming new album at a beach house, where they stayed for a week. The recording sessions took place in November 2015, for ten days, at the prestigious Estudio del Sur, in Maria Pinto, 54 km west of the Chilean capital.

'Hawaii' is a two-disc concept album about human colonies established in space after the destruction of the Earth. Its twelve tracks explore the dilemmas and challenges that the individual and the human spirit would face in this futuristic scenario. The album was praised by the critics; it was chosen by Chilean premiere rock magazine as album of the year. 

The band toured Europe for the first time in their career in October 2016, following a release show at Cine Arte Alameda in Santiago. Aisles played in the Netherlands, France, Belgium and England.

In September 2020 the band introduced their new singer, Israel Jil, and are currently working on their fifth studio album, to be released in 2021.

Discography 
 The Yearning (2005)
 In Sudden Walks (2009)
 4:45 AM (2013)
 Hawaii (2016)
 Live from Estudio del Sur EP (2018)

Musical style 
Over the course of its career, Aisles has experimented with elements from a variety of genres and styles, including progressive rock, neo-prog, symphonic rock, art rock, classical and Latin music. The band has often been praised by its eclecticism, lyrical content and musical execution.

Band members 
Current members
 Israel Gil – lead vocals (2020–present)
 Germán Vergara – guitars, vocals, keyboards (2001–present)
 Felipe Candia – drums, percussion (2007-2009, 2010–present)
 Rodrigo Sepúlveda – guitars, vocals (2001–present)
 Juan Pablo Gaete – keyboards (2014–present)
 Daniel Baird-Kerr – bass (2013–present)

Former members
 Sebastián Vergara – lead vocals (2002–2018)
 Luis Vergara – keyboards (2001–2010)
 Felipe González – bass (2005–2010)
 Alejandro Meléndez – keyboards (2002–2014)
 Marco Prado – drums, percussion (2005–2006)
 Juan Carlos Raglianti – drums, percussion (2009–2010)

References

External links 
 Official website

Chilean progressive rock groups